Chorus is the second compilation album by the experimental space rock band Flying Saucer Attack. It collects tracks from singles, compilation cuts, and a John Peel radio session.

Track listing

 "Feedback Song" (5:40)
 "Light in the Evening" (4:02)
 "Popol Vuh III" (3:15)
 "Always" (4:29)
 "Feedback Song" (demo version) (2:53)
 "Second Hour" (3:33)
 "Beach Red Lullaby" (3:58)
 "There But Not There" (5:34)
 "February 8th" (4:15)
 "There Dub" (2:47)

References

1996 compilation albums
Drag City (record label) compilation albums
Domino Recording Company compilation albums
Flying Saucer Attack albums